Andrew James Nemecek (May 6, 1896May 8, 1984) was an American football and basketball player. 

Nemecek was born in Lorain, Ohio, in 1896 and attended Lorain High School.

He attended Ohio State University and played college football at the center position from 1919 to 1921. He received nine varsity letters in football, basketball, and track. In 1921, he received the Western Conference medal for combined excellence in scholarship and athletics.

He also played three seasons in the National Football League (NFL) as a guard and center for the Columbus Tigers from 1923 to 1925. He was selected as the second-team center on the 1924 All-Pro Team.  He also played professional basketball for the Columbus Kinners.

He worked as a surgeon in Shaker Heights, Ohio. He died in 1984 at a nursing home in Mayfield Heights, Ohio.

References

1896 births
1984 deaths
People from Lorain, Ohio
Players of American football from Ohio
American football centers
Ohio State Buckeyes football players
Columbus Tigers players